King's Highway 12, commonly referred to as Highway 12 and historically known as the Whitby and Sturgeon Bay Road, is a provincially maintained highway in the Canadian province of Ontario. The highway connects the eastern end of the Greater Toronto Area (GTA) with Kawartha Lakes (via Highway 7), Orillia and Midland before ending at Highway 93. It forms the Central Ontario Route of the Trans-Canada Highway system from north of Sunderland (Highway 7) to Coldwater (Highway 400). Highway 12 connects several small towns along its  route, and bypasses a short distance from many others. It is signed as a north–south route between Whitby and Orillia, and as an east–west route from there to Midland. The entire route is patrolled by the Ontario Provincial Police.

Highway 12 was first established in early 1922 between Highway 2 in Whitby and Lindsay. The section running east from Sunderland became part of Highway 7 before route numbering was introduced in 1925. Highway 12 was then routed through Beaverton and around the eastern and northern shores of Lake Simcoe to Orillia and later to Midland; Beaverton was bypassed during the 1960s. A majority of Highway 12 follows the historic Whitby and Sturgeon Bay Road, constructed in the mid-1800s to connect Whitby and Penetanguishene, both important naval ports of the time.

Route description 

The highway begins at Highway 407, just south of the community of Brooklin in the town of Whitby. It travels north and joins with Highway 7 on the southern edge of Brooklin. North of Sunderland, Highway 7 separates and travels east to Lindsay; Highway 12 thereafter receives the Trans-Canada Highway designation.

The highway continues north, following the eastern and northern shores of Lake Simcoe and bypassing Beaverton while curving to the northwest towards Orillia. It bypasses south of Orillia, and shares a routing with Highway 11 northwards for approximately two kilometres between interchanges 131 and 133. At the latter interchange, Highway 12 branches northwest towards Coldwater, where it joins Highway 400 between interchanges 141 and 147.

At Waubaushene, the Trans-Canada Highway designation ends as it follows Highway 400 as the Georgian Bay Route towards Parry Sound and Sudbury, while Highway 12 continues west towards Victoria Harbour, Port McNicoll, and the Martyrs' Shrine. The highway ends at a junction with Highway 93 at the western town limits of Midland.

History 

The oldest portion of Highway 12 was originally known as the Coldwater Portage and later the Coldwater Road, connecting the modern sites of Orillia and Coldwater by a  trail. Upper Canada Governor John Colborne surveyed the portage in 1830 and ordered it to be widened for wagon use. As the area was settled and an increasing need for land connection with the south arose, a new road was proposed from Whitby to Sturgeon Bay (near Waubaushene). In February 1843, the residents formally petitioned the government to construct the route. The Sturgeon Bay Road, from Coldwater to Sturgeon Bay, was opened as a rough wagon road in 1844. The Atherley Narrows, separating Lake Simcoe from Lake Couchiching, were surveyed in the early 1840s and the first causeway and bridge constructed in the years that followed. The portion of the route between Whitby and Orillia, however, was still under construction during the second half of the decade.

Highway 12 was first introduced into the provincial highway system on January 22, 1922,
The highway, initially known as the Whitby–Lindsay Road, was not numbered until the summer of 1925.
The route followed the present-day Highway12 from Whitby to Sunderland, then travelled east to Lindsay.

Highway assumptions carried out on June 22 and July 2, 1927, extended Highway 7 east from Brampton to Peterborough. In doing so, it became concurrent with Highway 12 between Whitby and Sunderland. The route of Highway 12 between Sunderland and Lindsay was renumbered as part of Highway 7 at this time. Highway 12 was later extended north to Orillia, via Beaverton. This was accomplished through two assumptions. on August 17, the majority of the route through Brock, Thorah and Mara Townships was assumed. Several more miles were assumed on December 28, 1927, extending Highway 12 as far as Orillia. On August 5, 1931, Highway 12 was extended from Orillia to Midland. The majority of the route paralleled an existing railway that was constructed over a native portage.

Highway 12 remained unaltered for several decades, until the mid-1960s, when the Beaverton Bypass was constructed. On November 4, 1966, the  bypass opened, routing Highway 12 to the east. Portions of the former route of Highway 12 were renumbered as Highway 48B. The highway again remained unchanged for several decades, until a short portion of the southern end of the highway was decommissioned in the late 1990s. On April 1, 1997, the portions of Highway 12 south of Brooklin were transferred to municipal government.

Prior to the highway downloadings of 1997 and 1998, Highway 12 was also not routed concurrently along Highway 400 between Coldwater and Waubaushene, but instead ran as a single roadway, parallel to, and crossing, the 400. The bypassed section was redesignated as Simcoe County Road 16. That section was signed as "TO 12" until 2016, when Highway 12 was officially rerouted along Vasey Road and onto a concurrency with Highway 400.

Major intersections

References

External links 

Canada NewsWire Press Release
 Highway 12 Photos

012
Ontario 012
Highway 12
Highway 12
Transport in Orillia
Transport in Whitby, Ontario